Hermann Danuser (born 3 October 1946) is a Swiss-German musicologist.

Life 
Born in Frauenfeld, Danuser studied piano, oboe, musicology, philosophy and German language and literature at the Musikhochschule and the University of Zurich from 1965; he received his doctorate with a dissertation on musical prose. From 1973 he studied in Berlin with Carl Dahlhaus (musicology) and Gerhard Puchelt (piano). After working as a research assistant, he habilitated in 1982 at the Technical University of Berlin with a thesis on the music of the 20th century (published in 1984). From 1982 to 1988, Danuser taught as professor for musicology at the Hochschule für Musik, Theater und Medien Hannover, then from 1988 to 1993 as professor for musicology at the Albert-Ludwigs-University Freiburg. From 1993 until his retirement in 2014, he held the chair for Historical Musicology at the Institute for Musicology and Media Studies of the Humboldt University of Berlin.

He has held guest professorships at several leading universities in Europe and the USA. In the academic year 2017/18 he taught at the Central Conservatory of Music in Beijing.

Research 
Danuser's research focuses on music history of the 18th to 20th centuries, musical interpretation, the more recent history of music theory and aesthetics of music, and music analysis; he combines work analysis, music-aesthetic discourse formation, biography, genre and institutional history. In studies on avant-garde, nationalism, poetics, aesthetics and historiography he draws on transdisciplinary approaches. His most recent and currently ongoing research projects deal with the interaction of factors aesthetic to autonomy and heteronomy in the musical work of art (monograph Weltanschauungsmusik, 2009, with analyses, etc.) on Beethoven's Symphony No. 9, on Music of Spheres (Sfærernes Musik) by Rued Langgaard and on Hindemith's opera Die Harmonie der Welt), the conceptual history of musical performance since the 18th century (sponsored by the Deutsche Forschungsgemeinschaft) as well as manifestations of musical self-reference (monograph Metamusik, 2017). Danuser's extensive publishing and editorial activities make him one of the most important German-speaking musicologists of the present day.

Honours 
Danuser is a full member of the Berlin-Brandenburg Academy of Sciences and Humanities and a Corresponding Member of the American Musicological Society. In 2005, the Royal Holloway of the University of London awarded him the title of Doctor of Music honoris causa for his scientific merits; a further honorary doctorate was conferred on him in 2014 by the National University of Music Bucharest. In 2015 he was elected to the American Academy of Arts and Sciences.

Publications

Monographs

Editions of musical works

Published writings

Series and journals

Private editions

Lectures, essays and articles 
Hundreds of essays and articles in specialist periodicals and reference works, introductions, forewords and epilogues, honours, newspaper articles and much more  a.m.
A selection of 125 texts has been published in a four-volume edition (arranged under the volume titles "Theory", "Aesthetics", "Historiography" and "Analysis"):

Dedicated works

External links 
 Hermann Danuser im WorldCat
 
 Literatur von Hermann Danuser in the Bibliography of Music Literature
 Homepage am Musikwissenschaftlichen Seminar der HU Berlin
 Geförderte Projekte Hermann Danusers bei der Deutsche Forschungsgemeinschaft

References 

Swiss musicologists
20th-century German musicologists
21st-century German musicologists
Academic staff of the Hochschule für Musik, Theater und Medien Hannover
Academic staff of the University of Freiburg
Academic staff of the Humboldt University of Berlin
Fellows of the American Academy of Arts and Sciences
1946 births
Living people
People from Frauenfeld